Saxonville is a historic mill village located in the north end of the city of Framingham, in Middlesex County, Massachusetts 01701.

Geography 

Saxonville is located at 42.3203 degrees N latitude, 71.4404 degrees W longitude.

Large areas of Saxonville are situated on hilly terrain that rises up steeply in places from the Sudbury River, a small river that winds through the village.

In a description of the area for the proposed Saxonville Historic/Nature Walk, Stephen Herring (Framingham Town Historian), writes:

"...The area from the Concord Street Bridge to Central Street is surrounded on three sides by the Sudbury River, giving it the early name of Otter Neck. Framingham's first settler, John Stone, built his home at Otter Neck in 1647.   We do not know the exact site of the homestead.   Native Americans of the Nipmuc tribe had a village and fort here before the arrival of European settlers.   For almost two hundred years this part of Framingham was known as Stone's End due to the dominance of the Stone family.   It became Saxonville when the textile industry was established here, one of the early companies being named the Saxon Factory Company..."

In addition to the village's name, a road in the northern end is named Saxony Road. Though the name Saxonville has been thought to have come directly from Europe, Saxonville was named after a land development company, the Saxon or Saxony land development company.

History 
Native Americans lived and fished in the area of the Sudbury falls for centuries up through the 18th century. In the 1970s, arrowheads were found when portions of the river were drained to conduct maintenance on the dam and water control system around the falls.

In all likelihood Saxonville sprung up due to the Sudbury River's drop in elevation in the region and the free power represented by the falls. The first industry in Framingham was a grist mill that John Stone erected at the falls on the river, granted by Act of the Great and General Court of Massachusetts.  In May 1656, Edmund Rice and Peter Noyes surveyed  of land purchased by John Stone of Sudbury from the Indians that was supplemented by a grant of the General Court to Stone of an additional  at the Sudbury River falls.  The mill rights were held by the Stone family for 165 years when it was sold to the Saxonville Mills. Around 1865 a dam was built across the river to control and exploit for power. The remnants of the dam's power control gates and gears can still be seen near the falls at Central Street, near the intersection of Central and Water streets. An underground channel supplied water from above the falls to the manufacturing plant where it was used to drive water wheels or turbines to provide mechanical manufacturing power at the mill. The lower portion of the 1858 section of the mill where waste water exited the turbines and poured into the lower portion of the river is now behind flood control walls.

Through the 1960s Saxonville still had its own operating dairy in a high, flat area on Danforth street about 3/4 mile east of the village center. The Twin Maple Farms dairy was located just east of Meadow Street, bounded by Danforth Street. The dairy maintained a small herd of dairy cows located in fields near Danforth Street. Until 1966, the dairy operated a fleet of delivery trucks that delivered fresh milk and dairy products to homes around area. Sometime around 1967 the dairy ceased operations. The dairy's milking machines and bottling facility were left idle and slowly deteriorated through in the early 1970s. The site is now occupied by residences.

The town operated the Saxonville elementary school on the hilly portion of Elm Street, just above the village. Originally a wooden school house that held four large classrooms on two floors, it was replaced with a newer structure during the new deal era Works Progress Administration. The original structure became known as the annex. The annex building was still used into the 1960s. The building was razed in the 1970s when the town constructed a new gymnasium and cafeteria addition to the building. The school is now known as the Mary E. Stapleton school after a local school instructor and principal.

See also
Saxonville Historic District, encompassing a part of the village

References

External links
 Framingham Online
 Friends of Saxonville
 Saxonville Square Photos circa 1949

Framingham, Massachusetts
Villages in Middlesex County, Massachusetts
Villages in Massachusetts
1650 establishments in Massachusetts